Graeme Thomas Wood  (born 1947) is an Australian digital entrepreneur, philanthropist and environmentalist.

He is the founder of online travel site Wotif.com and has made investments in media, including backing The Guardian Australia and founding The Global Mail.

Career
In January 2013, Wood was named as a prominent backer of the digital arm of British newspaper The Guardian in Australia. He said it would add quality and diversity to Australian media as well as fostering a closer interaction with the rest of the world.

Wood founded The Global Mail, a not-for-profit multimedia site for journalism in the public interest. In July 2013 The Global Mail became the first institutional member of the Washington-based International Consortium of Investigative Journalists (ICIJ), as part of Wood's three-year, US$1.5 million grant to bolster cross-border investigative reporting.

Other businesses Wood has founded include Wotnews, which closed in 2012 after spawning We Are Hunted, a music recommendation website sold to Twitter in 2013.

In 2011, Wood acquired the Triabunna Woodchip Mill in Tasmania. He submitted plans for the rejuvenation of the site, renamed Spring Bay Mill, in September 2016.

Activism
The Graeme Wood Foundation supports environmental sustainability, the Arts, Tertiary Education and improved Justice for Australia's indigenous community. Wood founded Artology in 2011, an organisation focused on youth development and social change through the arts. Wood also founded Wild Mob in 2008, a not-for-profit organisation that aims to protect Australia's most threatened species and ecosystems by giving young people the opportunity to participate in conservation work and environmental education while experiencing some of Australia's most iconic wilderness destinations.

Wood was made a Member of the Order of Australia (AM) in the 2012 Australia Day Honours. He has been awarded Suncorp Queenslander of the Year, and received an Honorary Doctorate of Economics from the University of Queensland. He has been a significant donor to the University of Queensland, the University of Tasmania and Melbourne University.

Political involvement
Wood gave a political donation of A$1.6 million, to The Greens in 2010.

In October 2016 leaked emails from the account of John Podesta included a claim by a public relations company, Fenton Communications, that Wood had pledged  towards an advertising campaign to counter the climate change denial stance of media owned by Rupert Murdoch. Wood has since stated "It sounded like a good idea at the time but in the end I didn’t proceed with any funding".

References

1947 births
Living people
Australian businesspeople
Businesspeople in online retailing
People educated at Brisbane State High School
People from Rockhampton
Members of the Order of Australia